Identical Remote Controlled Reactions is the second studio album by Australian nu metal group Superheist. It is the only album to feature Joey Biro as lead vocalist. The album proved far stronger than their previous album, The Prize Recruit, in song personality and overall weight in sound. Though not taken as well by critics, it was well received by the fanbase. The album itself seemed far more adventurous in sound, with short instrumental interludes included between songs and far more experimentation with keyboards and bass.

It was recorded at Backbeach Studios in Rye, Victoria by dw Norton and Adam Rhodes.

Background 
In August 2001, Superheist supported Eminem at his Sydney concert, they also appeared at various festivals later that year: Livid (October/November), Meredith (mid-December), and Falls (late December). The group signed an international management deal with Gary Avilla (Papa Roach). However, founding lead singer Roderick "Berger" McLeod "no longer shared the band's commitment and enthusiasm" and had left in November.

In the next month he was replaced by Joey Biro (ex-From The Inside). Following the Big Day Out festival in January 2002, the group began work on their second album, Identical Remote Controlled Reactions, which was issued in September. It was co-produced by the band's guitarist Richard William "DW" Norton with Adam Rhodes. They recorded it at Backbeach Studios in Rye, Victoria. It peaked at No. 20 on the ARIA Albums Chart.

The lead single, "7 Years", had appeared in May 2002, which peaked at No. 29 – the group's highest charting single. It was followed in August by a semi-acoustic rock ballad, "A Dignified Rage", which peaked at No. 50. At the ARIA Music Awards of 2002, Norton and Rhodes were nominated for Engineer of the Year for "A Dignified Rage".

Track listing

Personnel 
Superheist
 dw Norton – guitar, backing vocals, producer
 Sean Pentecost – drums
 Fetah Sabawi – synthesisers, samplers
 Drew Dedman – bass guitar
 Joey Biro – lead vocals

Production work
 Producer, engineer, mixer – Adam Rhodes (tracks 1 to 4, 6 to 10, 12, 13, 15, 16), dw Norton (tracks 1 to 4, 6 to 10, 12, 13, 15, 16), Fetah Sabawi (tracks: 5, 11, 14, 17)
 Additional engineer – Chris Dickie, Forrester Savell, Richard Stolz
 Assistant engineer – Action Sam, Dan Reymer, Jimi Maroudas, Shae Mete
 Mastering – John Ruberto

Charts

References

2002 albums
Superheist albums
Shock Records albums